Thing Trunk is an independent game developer located in Warsaw. The company was established in August 2012 by Maciej Biedrzycki, Konstanty Kalicki and Filip Starzyński, former co-funders of Twin Bottles and Codeminion (known for casual games such as Phantasmat, Ancient Quest of Saqquarah, StoneLoops! of Jurassica).

History

Return 2 Games series 
The company initially focused on defining principles of Return 2 Games - a series of 7 titles aiming to re-capture the feeling and experience of classic games from the '90s. The series were announced three years after creation of the studio (2015). All games in the series will utilize card mechanics and take place in the same setting (called Paperverse) in which characters and objects are made of cut and folded paper. Games from the series are aimed at mid-core gamers. Games are made in CUG (Thing Trunk's in-house engine).

Games 
 Book of Demons - the game is the first installment of Return 2 Games series. The game was designed as a tribute to the classic isometric hack'n'slashes. Since 2016 the game is available on Steam.

Awards and nominations 

 Indie of the Year Awards 2017 - 10th place, IndieDB
 Momocon 2017 - "Indie Award Finalist", Atlanta
 Casual Connect 2016 - 1st place in Best Game Art, Tel Aviv
 Digital Dragons 2016 - 3rd place in Indie Showcase - Best Indie Game, Cracow
 Freegalaktus 2016 - "Best Game" in Jury's Choice category
 Pixel Heaven 2016 - "Pixel.Award Finalist", Warsaw

References

External links 
 Official website

Video game companies established in 2012
Polish companies established in 2012
Companies based in Warsaw
Video game companies of Poland
Video game development companies
Indie video game developers